Khalid Ali Sabah (born 5 October 2001), is a Qatari professional footballer who plays as a midfielder for Qatar Stars League side Al-Rayyan.

Career
Sabah started his career at the youth team of Al-Rayyan and represented the club at every level.

Career statistics

Club

References

External links
 

2001 births
Living people
Qatari footballers
Association football midfielders
Aspire Academy (Qatar) players
Al-Rayyan SC players
Qatar Stars League players